The NJ class are a class of diesel locomotive built in 1971 by Clyde Engineering, Granville for the Commonwealth Railways for use on the Central Australia Railway.

History
In 1969, Commonwealth Railways ordered six single-cab NJ class locomotives from Clyde Engineering for use on the narrow gauge  Central Australian Railway between Marree and Alice Springs. They hauled freight trains as and The Ghan. Built at Clyde Engineering's Granville factory, they featured many components from the company's new Kelso factory. Their cab was similar to that of the New South Wales 422 class locomotives that had recently been built.

In July 1975, all were included in the transfer of Commonwealth Railways to Australian National. Following the closure of the Central Australian Railway in December 1980 and their unsuitability for conversion to standard gauge, Australian National transferred them to its former Port Lincoln Division on Eyre Peninsula, South Australia. After a few teething problems, the class settled down and were employed hauling grain and gypsum services.

All six were sold with Australian National's South Australian operations to Australian Southern Railroad in August 1997 and renumbered as the 1600 class. Some were transferred to Australian Railroad Group to operate services in Western Australia. With the splitting up of Australian Railroad Group, two passed to Aurizon in February 2006 and four to Genesee & Wyoming Australia in June 2006.

In January 2015, the two Aurizon units were exported to Durban, South Africa.

In early 2019, 1604 (formerly NJ 4) was scrapped following a shunting accident at Cummins, South Australia in 2013. 1603 led the last GWA grain train to Cummins on 31 May 2019. 

The owner of the remaining three NJs, GWA was rebranded to One Rail Australia in February 2020 when G&W sold their share of the company. ORA sent 1603 to Port Augusta for overhaul in June 2022, but this overhaul was stopped following Aurizon's takeover of ORA the following month. As of 2023, 1601 and 1606 are working at Thevenard on gypsum trains.

Names
NJ1 was named after prime minister Ben Chifley, a former locomotive driver from Bathurst, near Kelso where many of the locomotives' components were manufactured. As of 2020, the locomotive unofficially carried the name "Thevenard" on the side of the locomotive cab, possibly reflecting the change to gypsum-only traffic for the motive power of the former South Australian Railways Port Lincoln Division.

References

Notes

Bibliography

External links

Aurizon diesel locomotives
Clyde Engineering locomotives
Co-Co locomotives
Commonwealth Railways diesel locomotives
Diesel locomotives of Western Australia
Railway locomotives introduced in 1971
3 ft 6 in gauge locomotives of Australia
Diesel-electric locomotives of Australia